Guy Middleton (4 August 1900 – 30 October 1994) was a French swimmer. He competed in the men's 4 × 200 metre freestyle relay event at the 1924 Summer Olympics.

References

External links
 

1900 births
1994 deaths
Olympic swimmers of France
Swimmers at the 1924 Summer Olympics
Place of birth missing
French male freestyle swimmers
20th-century French people